HMAS Bombard (P 99) was an  of the Royal Australian Navy (RAN).

Design and construction

The Attack class was ordered in 1964 to operate in Australian waters as patrol boats (based on lessons learned through using the s on patrols of Borneo during the Indonesia-Malaysia Confrontation, and to replace a variety of old patrol, search-and-rescue, and general-purpose craft. Initially, nine were ordered for the RAN, with another five for Papua New Guinea's Australian-run coastal security force, although another six ships were ordered to bring the class to twenty vessels. Propulsion machinery consisted of two 16-cylinder Paxman YJCM diesel engines, which supplied  to the two propellers. The ship's company consisted of three officers and sixteen sailors. Main armament was a bow-mounted Bofors 40 mm gun, supplemented by two .50-calibre M2 Browning machine guns and various small arms. The ships were designed with as many commercial components as possible: the Attacks were to operate in remote regions of Australia and New Guinea, and a town's hardware store would be more accessible than home base in a mechanical emergency.

Bombard was built by Walkers Limited at Maryborough, Queensland, launched on 6 July 1968, and commissioned on 5 November 1968.

Operational history
During 1978 and 1979, Bombard was one of two Attack-class vessels used to portray the fictional HMAS Ambush for ABC drama series Patrol Boat. For this, Bombards pennant number was changed to 83, to match the other patrol boat used, .

Bombard paid off on 12 September 1983, was transferred to the Indonesian Navy and renamed KRI Siribua. The patrol boat was listed in Jane's Fighting Ships as still operational in 2011.

Citations

References

Attack-class patrol boats
1968 ships